In foreign language teaching, the generative principle reflects the human capacity to generate an infinite number of phrases and sentences from a finite grammatical or linguistic competence. This capacity was captured in Wilhelm von Humboldt's famous phrase that language makes "infinite use of finite means". It is the theoretical basis for pattern drills and substitution tables - an essential component of the audio-lingual method - and may be considered as the necessary counterpart to the communicative principle, i.e. teaching communication through communicating (communicative language teaching; communicative competence).

Background

Children, in their process of first-language acquisition, notably in pre-sleep monologues, have been observed to use new phrases as models for more phrases, varying words or word groups during phases of essentially non-communicative verbal play in ways reminiscent of pattern drills.  Ruth Weir observed the following monologue in a 2½ year old subject:

 What colour
 What colour blanket
 What colour mop
 What colour glass

Autistic children find it particularly difficult to develop this flexibility that normal children naturally have. In second language acquisition children may begin with prefabricated patterns or chunks. As the learners begin to understand their internal structure, words are freed to recombine with other words, chunks are broken down, and in a process of substitution and variation, become models for analogous constructions.

In foreign language teaching, sentence manipulations in the form of pattern drills can be mechanical and monotonous, which has raised the question as to whether practice on sentence variations can really further communicative competence. Butzkamm & Caldwell suggest bilingual semi-communicative drills as a possible solution.

Examples

The teacher selects a new phrase from a textbook story, let’s say “What about my friend”. The idea is to turn it into a productive sentence pattern. So he gives a few more examples and starts  a very short drill with cues in the students’ native language (German):

Teacher: Was ist mit meinem Onkel?
Student: What about my uncle?
Teacher: Was ist mit unserem Präsidenten?
Student: What about our president?
Teacher: Was ist mit unserer Hausaufgabe?
Student: What about our homework?

These are disconnected sentences which are often rejected by leading theorists such as Lewis, who speaks of a "fundamentally flawed methodology". But notice that, for every sentence, we can easily come up with fitting communicative contexts - because of a comprehensive communicative competence developed by our mother tongue. Notice also the semantic leaps, especially from “president” to “homework”, for the students to see the semantic range of the new phrase and its applicability to a variety of situations.- The students are now ready to generate their own sentences / ideas. When the teacher reacts to the students’ sentences as if they were serious utterances, the drill can become semi-communicative. Witness the following extract from a lesson. The students (11-year-olds) have been practising “May I / we…”  and are now making their own sentences:

Student: May we smoke in this room?
Teacher: Not in this room. There are no ash trays.
Student: May I go home now?
Teacher: Not now, later.
Student: May I kill you now?
Teacher: Come on and try.

References

Further reading

 
 
 

Language-teaching methodology